The February 2016 Baghdad bombings occurred on 28 February 2016. At least 70 people were killed and 60 wounded in Sadr City, a southern suburb of Baghdad, as two bombs went off at a crowded market. The explosions ripped through a market selling mobile phones in the mainly Shiite Muslim district. The assailants were suicide bombers riding motorcycles through the crowd.

See also
 List of terrorist incidents, January–June 2016
 Terrorist incidents in Iraq in 2016
 Timeline of the Iraq War (2016)

References

2016 murders in Iraq
Suicide bombings in 2016
21st-century mass murder in Iraq
2010s in Baghdad
Marketplace attacks in Iraq
Crime in Baghdad
Mass murder in 2016
Terrorist incidents in Iraq in 2016
Suicide bombings in Baghdad
2016-02
ISIL terrorist incidents in Iraq
Islamic terrorist incidents in 2016
February 2016 crimes in Asia